Ricardo Luis Amigorena (born May 30, 1972 in Maipú, Mendoza Province, Argentina), better known as Mike Amigorena is an Argentine actor.

Biography
He was born  in Maipú, Mendoza Province to a Basque Argentine father and an Italian Argentine mother. Amigorena was especially restless as an adolescent and was expelled from a number of secondary schools. He left Maipú for Buenos Aires in search of fame in 1992, and initially struggled in a variety of menial jobs, living hand-to-mouth in a tenement for a number of years.

Personal life
Since May 2018 he is in a relationship with the singer Sofía Vitola. On February 4, 2020 they became parents for the first time of a girl whom they called Miel Amigorena Vitola.

Career
He was eventually discovered by a modeling agency and in 1992, was given a small role in leading local comic Guillermo Francella's sitcom, La familia Benvenuto. He later appeared in the popular teen drama, Montaña rusa ("Rollercoaster"), and in the mid-1990s, enrolled in a theatre school, mentored first by Santiago Doria, and later, Alfredo Zemma, of the Argentine Actors' Association. He first appeared in Buenos Aires' vibrant theatre scene in 1995 and became a prolific stage actor, notably in a 1998 local production of German playwright Frank Wedekind's Spring Awakening, and in a compressed Shakespeare production from 2004 to 2006, which earned him Argentine ACE and Clarín Awards. He was given his first film role by directors Florencia Di Baja and Germán Drexler, as the leading man in their comedy, Tus ojos brillaban (Bright Eyes), in 2004, and was reunited with Francella in 2005 in his top-rated sitcom, Casados con hijos ("Married with Children"). Two comedy film roles, in Gabriel Condrón's Un peso, un dólar (2006) and as the lead in Tatiana Merenuk's romantic comedy, Yo soy sola (I'm Alone, 2008), were followed by his role as Martín Pells in the primetime Telefe sitcom, Los exitosos Pells, which premiered in May 2008 and for which he received a Martín Fierro Award. Amigorena was among the Argentine actors asked to appear in Francis Ford Coppola's production set in Buenos Aires, Tetro (2009). He had a band called "Ambulancia" with his friends and he was the lead vocalist in his indie rock, they did covers and their own songs. In 2015 the band dissolved.

Filmography

Television

Theater

Movies

Awards

References

1972 births
Living people
Argentine television personalities
Argentine male actors
21st-century Argentine male singers
People from Maipú, Argentina
Argentine people of Basque descent